Risograph is a brand of digital duplicators manufactured by the Riso Kagaku Corporation, that are designed mainly for high-volume photocopying and printing. It was released in Japan in 1980. It is sometimes called a printer-duplicator, as newer models can be used as a network printer as well as a stand-alone duplicator. When printing or copying many duplicates (generally more than 100) of the same content, it is typically far less expensive per page than a conventional photocopier, laser printer, or inkjet printer.

Process 

The underlying technology is very similar to a mimeograph. It brings together several processes which were previously carried out manually, for example using the Riso Print Gocco system or the Gestetner system.

This simple technology is highly reliable compared to a standard photocopier and can achieve both very high speed (typically 150 pages per minute) and very low costs per copy when copying more than 100 copies. A good lifespan for a risograph might involve making 100,000 masters and 5,000,000 copies.

Risograph printers use a soy ink made from vegetable soybean oil. One disadvantage of this soy based ink printing medium is that all paper stock has to be uncoated for the ink to dry and adhere to the paper stock.

Because the process involves real ink like in offset printing, and does not require heat to fix the image on the paper that a photocopier or laser printer does, the output from a risograph can be treated like any offset-printed material. This means that sheets which have been through a risograph may be fed through a laser printer afterwards and vice versa.

Risographs have typically had interchangeable color inks and drums allowing for printing in different colors or using spot color in a single print job. The Riso MZ series models have two ink drums, thereby allowing two colors to be printed in one pass.

How to print 

After sending the original through the machine, the Risograph makes an original master by making microscopic holes in the master with thermal heads.

This master is then wrapped around a drum and the ink is forced through the voids in the master. The paper runs flat through the machine while the drum rotates at high speed to create each image on the paper.

It's possible to print a document sending it via USB or scan it analogically with the platen glass scanner.

Manufacture 

The key master-making thermal head component is manufactured by Toshiba. Machines similar to Risographs are manufactured by Ricoh, Gestetner, Rex Rotary, Nashuatec and Duplo. Gestetner, Rex Rotary and Nashuatec are now owned by Ricoh.

Use 

For schools, clubs, churches, colleges, political campaigns, and other short-run print jobs, the risograph bridges the gap between a standard photocopier (which is cheaper up to about 100 copies) and using an offset press (which is cheaper over about 10,000 copies).

References

External links 

 
 US Riso Site
 UK Riso Site

Japanese brands
Printing
Printing devices
Office equipment